Among the Barons is a 2003 book by Margaret Peterson Haddix, about a time in which drastic measures have been taken to quell overpopulation. It is the fourth of seven novels in the Shadow Children series.

Plot summary 

The novel begins at the home of the Grants. The Grants are Barons, meaning that they belong among the super-elite class, which hoards most of the country’s resources and controls the government. The Grants have only one surviving son, Smits, having lost their other son, Lee, in a skiing accident not long ago. To turn the tragedy into something good, Mr. and Mrs. Grant gave their son’s name to a shadow child named Luke, allowing him to come out of hiding and attend school like a legal child. To keep up the appearances of familial love, the Grants send Smits to Luke’s school, Hendricks’ School for Boys, for a visit. Accompanied by a bodyguard named Oscar, he sullenly agrees, still distraught over the loss of his brother, embittered by the substitution of Luke, which he sees as a decision to replace the real Lee. At the school, Smits tells Luke (who passes publicly as “Lee”) a number of fond memories about his brother.

Eventually, Smits tires of having Oscar watch over him. He lights fire to the school in an act of protest and tries to leave alone. Once the fire is suppressed, Luke goes back to the Grants’ house. There, he searches through Smits’s room and finds two fake identification cards, one that identifies Smits as Peter Goodard. The other card, with a blank picture, reads Stanley Goodard. From these, Luke infers that the Grants are hatching a plan to adopt yet another identity for him. Having lost their son, but being unable to publicly mourn his death, they intend to backtrack and announce it, after all, throwing Luke back into the darkness.

Luke soon finds that the plot is even more sinister. Though the Grants are indeed motivated by greed, the real reason is that Smits has threatened to expose the real reason for Lee’s death: he died on a rebel mission to overthrow the fascist government. If they are discovered, they risk the death penalty. The Grants’ fear of their own danger now threatens Luke’s very existence. He soon suspects that the Grants gave him a new chance at life not acting out of altruism, but rather in a long-term gamble to stage a different death for a fake Lee.

The Grants stage a party at their mansion to welcome “Lee” home. The party is attended by many of the government’s most prominent leaders, including its president, who is credited with beginning the war that installed the Population Police, leading to widespread atrocities. In a twist, it is revealed that the bodyguard Oscar is a rebel. He tries to assassinate the president, as well as Luke; his attempt on the politician’s life fails, and Trey rescues Luke just in time. A chandelier detaches from the ceiling, crushing Mr. and Mrs. Grant. This event has a silver lining: with the deaths of the Grants, no one remains who wants to revoke his legal status. Furthermore, Smits will have to corroborate his familial relationship or risk his own safety.

At the end of the novel, Luke and Smits escape the Barons and Population Police, speeding away in a van with some friends and arriving at Luke’s house. Trey steals a number of papers that seem to be valuable and related to the secret workings of the government, but it is not revealed what they are. Luke’s parents, relieved, welcome Luke home, and take in Smits as one of their own. Luke redoubles his resolve to save more shadow children and overthrow the Population Police.

Characters 

Lee Grant (Luke Garner): An illegal third born child living under an assumed name. The overall story protagonist and center point of most of the books in the series.

Smits (Smithfield Grant): The biological brother of the true Lee Grant, serves as a deuteragonist.

Travis Jackson (Trey): Another illegal third child and a companion to Luke Garner, a returning character.

Oscar: A bodyguard for the Grant family with his own hidden agenda.

References 

 Among The Barons Synopsis, SuperSummary

2003 American novels
Shadow Children
Novels by Margaret Peterson Haddix
Dystopian novels
2002 science fiction novels
American young adult novels